is a former Japanese rugby union player who played as a fly-half. He was named in the Japan squad for the 2007 Rugby World Cup, but didn't make an appearance at the tournament. He did though make 13 appearances for Japan in his career, scoring 55 points.

References

External links
itsrugby.co.uk profile

1982 births
Living people
Japanese rugby union players
Rugby union fly-halves
Green Rockets Tokatsu players